LaunchCode, headquartered in St. Louis Missouri, is a Non-profit organization that helps people enter the technology field by providing free and accessible education, training, and paid apprenticeship placements. 

Its courses and programs include:
LC101 is LaunchCode's part-time evening flagship course. In a classroom with mentoring from instructors, teaching fellows and local developers, students learn programming concepts in JavaScript before moving on to a skill track focused on either Java or C#.
 Women+ (formerly CoderGirl): Is LaunchCode's education program for everyone who identifies as female, students choose one of seven 24- or 45-week specialized skill tracks that lead to an apprenticeship job program.
 Immersive CodeCamp is a 14-week, full-time course taking a deep dive into in-demand technologies and skills. 
 Liftoff is a career readiness and project course for pre-apprenticeship.
 Discovery is a free, self-paced online program developed to introduce people to computer programming and help them determine if they want to pursue a career in tech. 

LaunchCode also offers apprenticeships: full-time, paid positions with partner companies. A LaunchCode apprenticeship is a full-time, paid position with one of LaunchCode’s hiring partners. During the apprenticeship, candidates work on a team of experienced developers and are paired with a mentor that invests in their growth. Candidates are carefully matched with hiring companies for compatibility in technical skills, soft skills, workplace fit, and drive.

In 2020, 60% of LaunchCode students identified as women or non-binary, 49% identified as people of color, 19% identified as LGBTQIA+, and 46% did not have a 4-year degree.

References

External links
LaunchCode website

Computer programming
Privately held companies of the United States
American educational websites